Napoleonaea lutea is a species of woody plant in the family Lecythidaceae. It is found only in Nigeria. It is threatened by habitat loss.

References

lutea
Endemic flora of Nigeria
Critically endangered flora of Africa
Taxonomy articles created by Polbot